The canton of Nantua is an administrative division in eastern France. At the French canton reorganisation which came into effect in March 2015, the canton was expanded from 12 to 18 communes (2 of which merged into the new commune Le Poizat-Lalleyriat):
 
Apremont
Béard-Géovreissiat
Belleydoux
Bellignat
Brion
Charix
Échallon
Géovreisset
Groissiat
Maillat
Martignat
Montréal-la-Cluse
Nantua
Les Neyrolles
Le Poizat-Lalleyriat
Port
Saint-Martin-du-Frêne

Demographics

See also
Cantons of the Ain department 
Communes of France

References

Cantons of Ain